The air commanders of World War I were army or navy officers who came to command air services during the first major conflict in which air power played a significant role.

Entente Powers air commanders

British Empire

Australian Flying Corps

1914–1919 – Lieutenant Colonel Edgar Reynolds, General Staff Officer for Aviation, Australian Imperial Force
1918 - Lieutenant Colonel Richard Williams, Officer Commanding (Acting) RAF Palestine Brigade

Royal Flying Corps

Director-General of Military Aeronautics
1914–1917 – Lieutenant-General Sir David Henderson
1917–1918 – Major-General John Salmond
1918 – Brigadier-General Edward Ellington

General Officer Commanding the RFC in France

1914–1915 – Major-General Sir David Henderson
1915–1918 – Major-General Hugh Trenchard
1918 – Major-General John Salmond

Royal Naval Air Service

Heads of the RNAS
1914–1915 – Captain Murray Sueter, Director of the Admiralty Air Department
1915–1917 – Rear Admiral Charles Vaughan-Lee, Director of the Admiralty Air Department
1917–1918 – Commodore Godfrey Paine, Fifth Sea Lord and Director of Naval Aviation

Royal Air Force

Chief of the Air Staff
1918 – Major-General Sir Hugh Trenchard
1918 – Major-General Frederick Sykes

France

Director of Military Aeronautics
1914–1915 Brigadier General Auguste Edouard Hirschauer
position vacant
1916 Henry Jacques Regnier

Head of the Service Aéronautique
to December 1916 Colonel Édouard Barès
December 1916 to August 1917 Commandant Paul du Peuty
August 1917 to __ Colonel Charles Duval

Greece
Hellenic Naval Air Service: Lt Commander Aristeidis Moraitinis (1917–1918)

Imperial Russia
Grand Duke Alexander Mikhailovich, Field Inspector General of the Imperial Russian Air Service
General Alexander von Kaulbars (Head of Russian Aviation in the Field, 1914-1915)
Colonel Sergey Oulianine (Head of the Directorate of the Air Force, 1917-1918)

Italy

Maurizio Moris, General Director for Aeronautics (1915)
 (1915–1917)
Luigi Bongiovanni (1918–1919)

Romania

General Inspector of Engineering and Aeronautics
1913-1915 - General Mihail Boteanu

Commander of the RAC
1915-1916; 1918-1920 - Brigadier General Constantin Găvănescu
1916 - Major Gheorghe Rujinschi
1916-1918 - Major De Malherbe

Director of the Aeronautics
1916-1918 - Lieutenant-colonel 
1918-1920 - Brigadier General Constantin Găvănescu

United States

Chief of Air Service of the American Expeditionary Force in France
30 June 1917 - Lieutenant-Colonel William L. Mitchell
3 September 1917 - Brigadier-General William L. Kenly
27 November 1917 - Brigadier-General Benjamin Foulois
29 May 1918 - Major-General Mason Patrick

Air Commander, Zone of Advance on the American Expeditionary Force in France
Brigadier-General Billy Mitchell

Central Powers air commanders

Germany
Führer der Luftschiffe (Admiral 2nd Class) Peter Strasser, Commander of naval Airships (1915–1918)
Major, later Lieutenant-Colonel and then Colonel, Hermann von der Lieth-Thomsen, Chief of Field Air Services (1915–1916), Air Service Chief of Staff (1916–1919)
Lieutenant-General Ernst von Hoeppner, Commanding General of the Air Service (1916–1919)

Inspector of Flying Troops
Colonel Walter von Eberhardt, Inspector of Flying Troops (1913–1914)
Major Richard Roethe, Inspector of Flying Troops (1914–1916)
Major, later Lieutenant-Colonel Wilhelm Siegert, 2nd Staff Officer of Field Air Services (1915–1916), Inspector of Flying Troops (1916–1918)
Captain Wilhelm Haehnelt, Air Commander 5th Army (1915–1916), Air Commander 1st Army (1916–1918), Inspector of Flying Troops (1918–1919)

Austro-Hungarian Empire
Colonel, later Major General Emil Uzelac, Commander of the Austro-Hungarian Imperial and Royal Aviation Troops (1912–1918)
Colonel General Archduke Josef Ferdinand, Inspector General of the Imperial Air Force (1917–1918)

Ottoman Empire

Bulgaria

References